Khumo Motlhabane (born 17 February 1981) is a Motswana footballer now retired, he used to play for Kanye Southern Pirates, Jwaneng Comets FC, Botswana Meat commission FC, Extension Gunners FC and Uniao Flamengo Santos FC in the Mascom Premier League.

External links

1981 births
Living people
Botswana footballers
Botswana international footballers
Uniao Flamengo Santos F.C. players
Association footballers not categorized by position